Makhosazane Christine Masilela is a South African politician who has represented the African National Congress (ANC) in the Mpumalanga Provincial Legislature since 2019. She was appointed Speaker of the Provincial Legislature in March 2021.

Political career 
Masilela was elected to her legislative seat in the 2019 general election, ranked 19th on the ANC's provincial party list. On 2 March 2021, she was elected unopposed as Speaker of the provincial legislature, with James Skosana as her deputy. Masilela and Skosana succeeded Busisiwe Shiba and her deputy Vusi Mkhatshwa, who had left their offices to join the Mpumalanga Executive Council. Masilela's appointment was welcomed by the opposition Democratic Alliance and Freedom Front Plus.

She is also active in the ANC's Ehlanzeni regional branch, the party's largest branch in Mpumalanga. In April 2022, at a party elective conference in White River, she was elected Deputy Regional Chairperson of the Ehlanzeni ANC, beating Momotho Thumbathi in a vote. She stood for the position as Jackie Macie's running mate on a slate viewed as politically aligned to Mandla Ndlovu, the recently elected Provincial Chairperson of the Mpumalanga ANC. She and Macie defeated an opposing slate led by Gillion Mashego and Ngrayi Ngwenya, both strong allies of David Mabuza, Ndlovu's predecessor and rival.

References

External links 
 

Living people
Year of birth missing (living people)
Members of the Mpumalanga Provincial Legislature
African National Congress politicians
21st-century South African politicians
Women legislative speakers